Triplophysa paradoxa, the Talas stone loach, is a species of stone loach in the genus Triplophysa. It is found in the Talas River Basin in Kyrgyzstan and some small rivers in the Karatau Mountains (South Kazakhstan)

Footnotes 

P
Freshwater fish of Asia
Taxa named by Fedor Alekseevich Turdakov
Fish described in 1955